Savusavu Airport  is an airport located near Savusavu, a town in the province of Cakaudrove on the island of Vanua Levu in Fiji. It is operated by Airports Fiji Limited.

Airlines and destinations

References

External links
 Savusavu and Airport
 December 4 2007 - Cabinet approves Savusavu Airport Upgrading 
 

Airports in Fiji
Vanua Levu